The Pacific stump-toed gecko (Gehyra insulensis) is a species of gecko found on Roratonga, Tonga, and Micronesia. It has been synonymized with Gehyra mutilata by many previous authors but more recently accepted as a valid species.

References

Gehyra
Reptiles described in 1858